Bastien Charles Patrick Héry (born 23 March 1992) is a professional footballer who plays as a midfielder, most recently for League of Ireland First Division club Galway United F.C.. Born in France, he represents the Madagascar national team.

Héry started his career at Paris Saint-Germain II, before moving to England to join Sheffield Wednesday's Development Squad in June 2012. In summer 2013, Héry became Keith Hill's first signing at Rochdale. Héry emerged as a big influence in the final weeks of the campaign as Rochdale secured promotion to League One. In his second season with the club he went on to become a prominent figure within the team featuring on 28 occasions during the 2014–15 season which saw Rochdale finish in the top half of the division. He then went on to play for Carlisle United before a spell at Accrington Stanley. He then signed for League of Ireland Premier Division side Limerick for the 2017 season before signing for their Munster neighbours Waterford. After a spell at Linfield, Bastien Héry signed for Dublin club Bohemians. On 27 July 2021, Hery signed for Derry City on loan until the end of the season.

Club career

Early career
Born in Brou-sur-Chantereine, France, Héry started playing football when he was six and joined US Torcy. Héry then joined Paris Saint-Germain. Héry revealed he went on a trial at Toulouse, Strasbourg and Auxerre.

After two years at PSG since turning professional, Héry was released by the club before joining EFL Championship club Sheffield Wednesday in the summer of 2012. Héry stated moving to England helped him cope leaving PSG.

Rochdale
Having been unable to break into the Sheffield Wednesday side Héry joined League Two side Rochdale on 8 May 2013 on a free transfer. Upon joining Rochdale, Héry was given the number fourteen shirt.

He made his professional debut on 6 August 2013 in a Football League Cup match at Doncaster Rovers. Soon after, Héry spoke about his move to Rochdale, quoting: "Last season at Sheffield Wednesday I only played in the development squad so this is my first experience of first team football and I'm enjoying it. I have learnt more in three months here playing first team football than I did during one year with the development squad." Héry scored his first goal for the club on 12 October 2013, in a 3–0 win over Newport County. After only making twelve appearances that season, Rochdale were promoted to League One. Héry signed a new two-year contract with Rochdale on 27 June 2014.

In 2014–15 season, Héry scored his first goal of the season, in a 3–2 win against Swindon Town on 21 October 2014. In his second season at Rochdale, Héry made twenty-eight appearances and scoring once in all competition, as Rochdale remained in League One for another season.

Héry was subject to a media report in February 2015 which suggested that he had called the town of his home club a "dump", Héry denied the report was accurate and stated he had been misquoted by the French media from which the interview was conducted. On 24 June 2015, Héry left Rochdale by mutual consent.

Carlisle United
On 24 June 2015, Héry joined League Two side Carlisle United on a one-year contract. Héry gained national recognition for his performance in the third round of the League Cup, assisting Derek Asamoah in a goal against Liverpool to draw the game 1–1 at full time. The game went to a penalty shootout and Héry missed the decisive kick which eliminated Carlisle.

Accrington Stanley
Héry left Carlisle at the end of the 2015–16 season to join league two play-off finalists Accrington Stanley for the 2016—17 season on an initial one-year contract with a view to extend for a second.

Limerick
On 22 January 2017 Héry signed for League of Ireland Premier Division side Limerick for the 2017 season. Initially used as a substitute, Hery eventually won a starting place and his performances in midfield won him both awards for both man-of-the-match and Player of the Month. His one goal of the 2017 season came when he scored a crucial last-minute goal at home to Bray to put Limerick 4–3 in front.

Waterford
Héry signed for Waterford for the 2018 League of Ireland Premier Division season. Héry made his debut in a 2–1 win against Derry City on 17 February 2018. He scored his first goal for the club against St Patrick's Athletic in a 2–0 win in 2018 . After a series of impressive performances for Waterford, Héry signed a two-year extension to his contract.

Héry won the 2018 Senior Player of the Year as well as the 2018 Goal of the Season for his strike in the 2–0 February win against St. Patrick's Athletic. Héry was also named on the 2018 League of Ireland Team of the Year.

Linfield
On 9 July 2019, it was confirmed that Héry had joined Linfield in a transfer deal that saw striker Michael O'Connor join Waterford on loan.

The next day, he impressed in his debut game for Linfield at home against Rosenberg in a 2–0 defeat in the 2019–20 UEFA Champions League first qualifying round.
A 6–0 aggregate defeat saw Linfield drop down into the UEFA Europa League second qualifying round Champions Path, where they faced Faroese champions HB Tórshavn. A 3–2 win on aggregate secured a place in the third qualifying round of the Europa League for the first time. After the win, Linfield goalkeeper Gareth Deane praised Héry, saying "His ability on the ball and passing is superb. He's also so calm and collected in possession. He wants to get on the ball and take possession even if there are two men up his back. He's been fabulous so far".
Linfield faced Montenegro champions Sutjeska in the Europa League third qualifying round. They won 2-1 in the away leg with Héry setting up the winner with a through ball to Kirk Miller.
This was followed up with a 3–2 win in the second leg at Windsor Park, with Linfield winning 5–3 on aggregate to become the first Irish League side to reach the play-off round of the Europa League.  In the play-off round, the Blues were drawn to face Azerbaijan champions Qarabağ, with the winners qualifying for the Europa League group stage. After winning 3-2 at home, they lost the away tie 2-1 to exit the Europa League under the away goals rule.

Héry won a league medal as Linfield were crowned Champions of the Northern Ireland Football League for 2020.
Héry scored his first goal in European competition with a strike in Linfield's 2–0 victory over Tre Fiori of San Marino in the preliminary round of the UEFA Champions League on 8 August 2020.

Bohemians
On 16 January 2021, Bastien Héry signed for Dublin club Bohemians in the League of Ireland Premier Division. After making just 1 start and 4 more appearances off the bench from Bohs' first 24 games, he was linked with a loan out from the club, departing on the 27th July 2021 to Derry City.

Derry City loan
Héry signed for Derry City on loan until the end of the season on the 27th July 2021. He made his debut on the 31st July 2021, coming off the bench in a 2–0 win away to Longford Town at Bishopsgate.

Finn Harps
On 14 January 2022, it was announced that Héry had joined Derry City's local rivals Finn Harps on a permanent basis, his fifth League of Ireland club.

Galway United loan
On 29 July 2022, League of Ireland First Division side Galway United announced that Héry would be joining on loan from Finn Harps for the remainder of the 2022 season. He made his debut 2 days later in a 7–0 win over Bluebell United in the FAI Cup.

International career
Bastien Héry has represented the Madagascar national football team. He was born in France, and is of Malgasy descent. He is a youth international for France. He was called up to represent Madagascar national football team for Africa Cup of Nations qualifiers in March 2020. He debuted for Madagascar in a friendly 2–1 loss to Burkina Faso on 11 October 2020.

Héry won his fourth international cap for Madagascar in a World Cup Qualifier defeat to Tanzania national football team on the 7th of September 2021.

Personal life

In 2021, Bastien Hery appeared in a Street Football film "Un Ballon" created by Peil Star. The film was shot in East Belfast.

Career statistics

Club

International

Honours
Linfield
NIFL Premiership: 2019–20

Individual
PFAI Team of the Year: 2018 Premier Division

References

External links

 

1992 births
Living people
Footballers from Seine-et-Marne
People with acquired Malagasy citizenship
Malagasy footballers
Madagascar international footballers
French footballers
France youth international footballers
French sportspeople of Malagasy descent
Association football midfielders
US Torcy players
Paris Saint-Germain F.C. players
Rochdale A.F.C. players
Carlisle United F.C. players
Accrington Stanley F.C. players
Limerick F.C. players
Waterford F.C. players
Bohemian F.C. players
Derry City F.C. players
Finn Harps F.C. players
Galway United F.C. players
English Football League players
League of Ireland players
French expatriate footballers
Expatriate footballers in England
Expatriate association footballers in the Republic of Ireland
French expatriate sportspeople in England